Nebria sajana is a species of ground beetle in the Nebriinae subfamily that can be found in Altai and Western Sayans. The name comes from the Sayan region where it lives.

References

sajana
Beetles described in 2001
Beetles of Europe